The 2011–12 San Diego State men's basketball team represented San Diego State University in the 2011–12 college basketball season. It was their 13th season in the Mountain West Conference. This was head coach Steve Fisher's thirteenth season at San Diego State. The Aztecs played their home games at Viejas Arena. They finished with a record of 26–8 overall and 10–4 in Mountain West play to be co-champions of the Mountain West with New Mexico. They lost in the championship game of the Mountain West Basketball tournament to New Mexico. They received an at-large bid into the 2012 NCAA tournament, earning the 6 seed in the Midwest which they lost to North Carolina State in the second round.

Off Season

Departures

Incoming Transfers

2011 Recruiting Class

Roster
Source

Schedule and results
Source
All times are Pacific

|-
!colspan=9| Exhibition

|-
!colspan=9| Regular season

|-
!colspan=9| 2012 Mountain West Conference men's basketball tournament

|-
!colspan=9 | 2012 NCAA tournament

Rankings

*AP does not release post-NCAA Tournament rankings.

References

External links
Aztec Basketball Official Site 

San Diego State
San Diego State Aztecs men's basketball seasons
San Diego State